Mahina Paul (born 19 April 2001) is a New Zealand rugby sevens player.

Paul has represented New Zealand in touch rugby and at the Youth Olympic Games for rugby sevens in 2018.

Paul made her Black Ferns Sevens international debut at the South Africa Sevens in Cape Town in 2019. She was one of three players who were handed professional contracts earlier that year. She later featured at the 2020 New Zealand Sevens in Hamilton.

Paul was named as a travelling reserve for the Black Ferns Sevens squad to the 2022 Commonwealth Games in Birmingham.

References

External links 

 Black Ferns Profile

2001 births
Living people
New Zealand female rugby union players
New Zealand female rugby sevens players
New Zealand women's international rugby sevens players
Rugby sevens players at the 2018 Summer Youth Olympics